Artyom Arkadyevich Voropayev (born 30 October 1999) is a Russian football player. He plays for FC Rodina Moscow.

Club career
He made his debut in the Russian Professional Football League for FC Lada-Tolyatti on 14 April 2016 in a game against FC Chelyabinsk.

He made his Russian Football National League debut for FC Spartak-2 Moscow on 17 July 2018 in a game against PFC Sochi.

References

External links
 Profile by Russian Professional Football League

1999 births
Sportspeople from Samara, Russia
Living people
Russian footballers
Association football defenders
FC Lada-Tolyatti players
FC Spartak-2 Moscow players
Russian First League players
Russian Second League players